In probability theory, Lindeberg's condition is a sufficient condition (and under certain conditions also a necessary condition) for the central limit theorem (CLT) to hold for a sequence of independent random variables. Unlike the classical CLT, which requires that the random variables in question have finite variance and be both independent and identically distributed, Lindeberg's CLT only requires that they have finite variance, satisfy Lindeberg's condition, and be independent. It is named after the Finnish mathematician Jarl Waldemar Lindeberg.

Statement

Assume the expected values  and variances  exist and are finite. Also let 

If this sequence of independent random variables  satisfies Lindeberg's condition:

for all , where 1{…} is the indicator function, then the central limit theorem holds, i.e. the random variables

converge in distribution to a standard normal random variable as 

Lindeberg's condition is sufficient, but not in general necessary (i.e. the inverse implication does not hold in general).
However, if the sequence of independent random variables in question satisfies

then Lindeberg's condition is both sufficient and necessary, i.e. it holds if and only if the result of central limit theorem holds.

Remarks

Feller's theorem
Feller's theorem can be used as an alternative method to prove that Lindeberg's condition holds. Letting  and for simplicity , the theorem states 

if ,  and  converges weakly to a standard normal distribution as  then  satisfies the Lindeberg's condition.

Interpretation

See also
Lyapunov condition
Central limit theorem

References

Theorems in statistics
Central limit theorem